Malina is a 1991 German-Austrian drama film directed by Werner Schroeter. The screenplay was adapted by Elfriede Jelinek from Ingeborg Bachmann's 1971 novel Malina. The film was entered into the 1991 Cannes Film Festival.

Cast
 Isabelle Huppert - The Woman
 Mathieu Carrière - Malina
 Can Togay - Ivan
 Fritz Schediwy - Father
 Isolde Barth - Mother
 Libgart Schwarz - Frl. Jellinek
 Elisabeth Krejcir - Lina
 Peter Kern - Bulgarian
 Jenny Drivala - Opera singer
 Wiebke Frost - Sister of the Woman
 Lisa Kreuzer - Die Frau (voice)
 Lolita Chammah - The Woman in childhood

See also
 Isabelle Huppert on screen and stage

References

External links

1991 films
1990s French-language films
1990s German-language films
1991 drama films
Films based on Austrian novels
Films directed by Werner Schroeter
Films set in Vienna
1991 multilingual films
Austrian multilingual films
German multilingual films
1990s German films
French-language German films